The 2009 ASA Kwik-Trip Midwest Tour presented by Echo Outdoor Power Equipment was the third season of the American Speed Association's Midwest Tour.  The championship was held over 12 races, beginning May 3 in Oregon, Wisconsin, and ending October 11 in West Salem, Wisconsin.  Steve Carlson was the champion.

Schedule and results

Championship points

References

Asa Midwest Tour
ASA Midwest Tour seasons